KaNyaka is a bairro in Maputo, Mozambique.

References 

Populated places in Mozambique